Behren-Lübchin is a municipality  in the district of Rostock, in Mecklenburg-Vorpommern, Germany.

Literature 
 Schuldt  E. Behren-Lübchin, Eine spät-slawische  Burganlage  in  Mecklenburg.  Berlin:  Akademie Verlag, 1965. 157 s.

References

Grand Duchy of Mecklenburg-Schwerin